Drácula contra Frankenstein (translation: Dracula against Frankenstein), also known as Dracula, Prisoner of Frankenstein (US title) is 1972 horror film co-written and directed by Jesús Franco. It stars Dennis Price, Howard Vernon, Paca Gabaldón, Alberto Dalbés, Luis Barboo, and Fernando Bilbao. It was a Spanish-French-Liechtensteinian-Portuguese co-production.

The plot centers on Dr. Frankenstein (Price), who successfully captures Count Dracula (Vernon), who along with his monster (Bilbao) controls the vampire for his own evil ends. It was the final of three films released variously in the United States under the title Dracula vs. Frankenstein, preceded by Los Monstruos del Terror (1969) and Dracula vs. Frankenstein (1971). It was Franco's second film to feature the character of Dracula, preceded by his 1970 film Count Dracula starring Christopher Lee in the titular role.

Cast 

 Dennis Price as Dr. Frankenstein
 Howard Vernon as Count Dracula
 Alberto Dalbés as Dr. Jonathan Seward
 Paca Gabaldón as Maria (credited as Mary Francis)
 Luis Barboo as Morpho
 Geneviève Robert as Amira the Gypsy
 Brandy as The Wolfman
 Fernando Bilbao as Frankenstein's monster
 Carmen Yazalde as Female Vampire (as Britt Nichols)
 Josyane Gibert as Estella
 Anne Libert as Dracula's Victim

References 

1972 films
1972 horror films
Dracula films
Frankenstein films
Horror crossover films
Spanish horror films
French horror films
1970s French films